Lim Jong-Eun (born 18 June 1990) is a South Korean footballer who currently plays for Ulsan Hyundai.

He was considered the star of the first leg of the 2018 Asian Champion League round of 16 by FOX Sports Asia in an article.

Club career statistics

Honours

Club
Ulsan Hyundai
 K League 1: 2022

References

External links

 FIFA Player Statistics

1990 births
Living people
Association football defenders
South Korean footballers
Ulsan Hyundai FC players
Seongnam FC players
Jeonnam Dragons players
Jeonbuk Hyundai Motors players
K League 1 players